August Bernhard Andersson (1877–1961) was a poet from Barva, Sweden. He became famous more than fifty years after his death, when his poems were released posthumously. The subjects of his poetry encompass nature, creation, the working man and religious themes (such as hymns and prayers).

Publications available in English 

 Evanescent Memories (collection)

References 

Swedish male poets
1877 births
1961 deaths
20th-century Swedish poets
Writers from Södermanland
20th-century Swedish male writers